Bay du Nord Wilderness Reserve is located in central part of the Island of Newfoundland in the province of Newfoundland and Labrador, Canada. The area encompasses an area of 2,895 km2 and is considered one of the last remaining unspoiled areas of the province devoid of human habitat. It was officially created as a wilderness reserve in 1990.

The area boasts as containing the largest protected river system in the province. Bay du Nord River, from which the area takes its name, was nominated as a Canadian Heritage River in 1992. Other features of the area would include Mount Sylvester, a monadnock formed during the last glacial period as well as the Tolt. The area is also the winter calving ground for the provinces largest caribou herd and contains the largest Canada goose habitat on the island.

Early visitors to the area includes the Mi'kmaq and geologist James Patrick Howley, who was the first European to travel the entire river system. Howley had erected a cairn as a surveying aid in triangulation on the summit of Mount Sylvester. This cairn still stands.

References
 Environment and Conservation

Parks in Newfoundland and Labrador